Chaplain (Rear Admiral) John Richard McNamara, USN (September 4, 1927 – April 16, 2001) was an American Navy officer who served as the 17th Chief of Chaplains of the United States Navy from 1985 to 1988. He was awarded the Bronze Star for service with the U.S. Marine Corps in Vietnam.

Background
Born in Boston, Massachusetts, McNamara earned a B.A. degree from the College of the Holy Cross in 1948 and a M.A. degree from Saint John's Seminary in 1952. He was ordained to the priesthood for the Roman Catholic Archdiocese of Boston by Archbishop Richard Cushing on January 10, 1952. On April 12, 1992, McNamara was named titular bishop of 'Risinium' and auxiliary bishop of the Boston Archdiocese and was ordained on May 21, 1992. He chose To echo Christ as his episcopal motto. He resigned on October 12, 1999, and died on April 16, 2001.

Military career
McNamara was commissioned in the United States Naval Reserve on May 7, 1962. He ministered to the 3rd Marine Division in Okinawa and Vietnam from June 1965 to March 1966. He was promoted to commodore on December 1, 1983.

See also

References

External links

1927 births
2001 deaths
College of the Holy Cross alumni
Saint John's Seminary (Massachusetts) alumni
Clergy from Boston
United States Navy chaplains
United States Navy personnel of the Vietnam War
United States Navy admirals
Chiefs of Chaplains of the United States Navy
20th-century American Roman Catholic titular bishops
United States Navy reservists